The Port Royal and Western Carolina Railway (PR&WC) was a railroad company in the southern United States that operated on  of  gauge track. It was formed in 1886 by the merger of the Augusta and Knoxville Railroad, Greenwood, Laurens and Spartanburg Railroad, Savannah Valley Railroad and the Greenville and Laurens Railroad, which then joined with Port Royal and Augusta Railway.

The Port Royal and Western Carolina, and Port Royal and Augusta were operated as part of the Central of Georgia Railroad line until the South Carolina General Assembly forced the railroad to give up the lines. The Charleston and Western Carolina Railway was formed in 1896 to operate the two lines.

The Atlantic Coast Line Railroad took over the Charleston and Western Carolina in 1897 but operated it as a subsidiary until 1959 when it was fully absorbed by the Atlantic Coast Line.

References

 

Defunct South Carolina railroads
Defunct Georgia (U.S. state) railroads
Railway companies established in 1886
Railway companies disestablished in 1896